The so-called Iburg Castle, is a castle and former Benedictine abbey in Bad Iburg, Germany.

From ca. 1100 till 1673 it was the seat of the Prince-Bishopric of Osnabrück. It is also notable as the birthplace of Sophia Charlotte of Hanover, Queen consort in Prussia.

References

External links

 Schlosskonzerte im Rittersaal des Iburger Schlosses
 Schlossbeleuchtungsverein
Grundriss der Festung Iburg aus dem Jahr 1654 auf kulturerbe.niedersachsen.de
 Rekonstruktionszeichnung von Wolfgang Braun

Castles in Lower Saxony
Bad Iburg
Benedictine monasteries in Germany